The second season of the Philippine reality singing competition The Voice Teens premiered on February 8, 2020 on ABS-CBN. Lea Salonga, Bamboo Mañalac and Sarah Geronimo returned to the show as coaches. The Voice of the Philippines coach apl.de.ap returned to the franchise after four years of hiatus, replacing Sharon Cuneta. The show is hosted by Alex Gonzaga and Luis Manzano – the two have previously worked together as hosts of the first season of The Voice Kids.

On March 21, 2020, the season was suspended until June 2020 due to the Enhanced community quarantine in Luzon done to lower the spread of the COVID-19 pandemic in the Philippines. Its timeslot was temporarily replaced by the re-run of the Kids' first season of Your Face Sounds Familiar (both Saturdays and Sundays) and sixth season of Pilipinas Got Talent (on Sundays only) until May 3, 2020, when ABS-CBN's free TV and Radio stations were forced off the air 2 days later. The season returned on June 13, 2020, via cable television.

The finale was aired on August 15 to 16, 2020. Heart Salvador of Team Bamboo, Cydel Gabutero of Team Lea, Isang Manlapaz of Team Apl, and Kendra Aguirre of Team Sarah were declared as co-champions.

Changes

Coaches' Line-up

In her column on December 19, 2019, it was confirmed that Lea Salonga will return to the show, alongside Bamboo Mañalac and Sarah Geronimo. They will return for their eighth, eighth, and seventh season of the franchise, respectively. It was also published that Apl.de.ap, one of the original coaches of The Voice of the Philippines, along with Salonga, Mañalac, and Geronimo, is set to return for his third season in the franchise, after four years of hiatus, replacing Sharon Cuneta.

Hosts
Luis Manzano returns as host while Alex Gonzaga replaced her sister, Toni Gonzaga, as host. The two have previously teamed up on the first season of The Voice Kids.

Mechanics
Several mechanics were changed since the first season. A new feature added in the Blind Auditions this season is the Block. Each coach are given two blocks to prevent one coach from getting a contestant. Also, each teams were increased to 16 members each, bringing the total of artists to 64.

Following the return of Apl.de.ap in the coaching panel, a monitor was installed on his red chair just like in the previous seasons of The Voice of the Philippines. This is to help him see the artists while performing since he is legally blind. The monitor turns on only upon pressing his button.

It was announced that the format of the live shows will change, but no further details were given. However, the Live Shows were changed to a pre-recorded work from home finale as a result of the coronavirus pandemic.

Online show
The online show entitled The Voice Teens DigiTV returns with KaladKaren Davila and Jeremy Glinoga. The pair has also previously hosted the online show for the fourth season of The Voice Kids. However, the 11th and 12th episodes were aired without a live feed of DigiTV as Metro Manila was placed under a partial lockdown in order to control the spread of COVID-19.

However, when the show resumed airing, The Voice Teens DigiTV resumed live via Zoom.

Community quarantine suspension
Due to the COVID-19 pandemic in the Philippines,  the government announced on March 12, 2020 that Metro Manila would be locked down on March 15, 2020. Due to this, the March 14 and 15 episodes aired without a live feed of The Voice Teens DigiTV, while the March 15 episode lasted for 105 minutes instead of 75.

However, when the entire Luzon was placed under an enhanced community quarantine, The Voice Teens suspended its telecast from March 21, 2020, despite taping its episodes prior to the enhanced community quarantine, in which the first season of Your Face Sounds Familiar Kids, filled its timeslot as part of the network's ECQ Special Programming, along with sixth season of Pilipinas Got Talent (on Sundays only) until the temporary closure of ABS-CBN due to the cease and desist order issued by the National Telecommunications Commission on account of its franchise expiration.

Teams

Blind auditions
The Blind auditions were taped on December 14, 2019 and ended on December 18, 2019. Around 120 artists auditioned for this season. A new feature within the Blind Auditions this season is the Block, which each coach can use twice to prevent one of the other coaches from getting a contestant.

 Color key

Episode 1 (February 8)
The coaches performed a cover of "Superheroes" at the start of the show.

Notes
a. Lea pressed her block button for Apl.de.ap. Based on the actual taping order, Lea had no blocks left at that moment. Therefore, Apl.de.ap was still able to turn and get the artist.

Episode 2 (February 9)

Episode 3 (February 15)

Episode 4 (February 16)

Episode 5 (February 22)

Episode 6 (February 23) 
Note: This timeslot aired at 8:45 p.m. of the pilot episode of 24/7 which runs for 105 minutes instead of 75.

Episode 7 (February 29)

Episode 8 (March 1) 
This episode returned to the 8:15 p.m. timeslot while 24/7 runs for 75 minutes.

Episode 9 (March 7)

Episode 10 (March 8)

Episode 11 (March 14) 
Starting this episode, The Voice Teens DigiTV is postponed due to the COVID-19 pandemic. However, the livestream of the televised series continues on Facebook and YouTube.

Notes
a. Lea pressed her block button for Apl.de.ap but he did not turn.

Episode 12 (March 15) 
This episode aired particularly longer from the usual 75 minutes to 100 minutes due to the postponement of Everybody Sing! because of the COVID-19 pandemic.

Notes
a. Lea pressed her block button for Bamboo but he did not turn.

Episode 13 (June 13) 
Despite being taped before the enhanced community quarantine, the airing of the episode was postponed from March 21 to June 13, 2020 due to the Enhanced community quarantine in Luzon, in which, reruns of the first season of Your Face Sounds Familiar Kids PH took over its timeslot for the duration of the ECQ. It was further deferred by the cease and desist order caused by the non-renewal of the ABS-CBN franchise. However, it resumed airing on June 13, 2020 via the Kapamilya Channel. The Voice Teens DigiTV also returned.

Notes
a. Lea pressed her block button for Bamboo but he did not turn.

Episode 14 (June 14)

Episode 15 (June 20)

Episode 16 (June 21) 
At the end of the blind auditions, Bamboo was not able to use his second block.

The Battles 

The Battles were filmed on February 24 to 25, 2020, with the band rehearsals filmed a week prior. The reveal of the battle pairings and the piano rehearsals took in Aqua Planet in Pampanga and Enchanted Kingdom in Santa Rosa, Laguna. The power to steal continues this season though the coaches will only have one steal. Nine artists per team will advance to the Knockouts.

Color key:

The Knockouts 
The Knockouts were filmed on February 28 and 29, 2020. The remaining artists are grouped into three by their respective coaches with one artist advancing to the Live Shows (which eventually was abolished in favor for the prerecorded Finale) per group. Each artist gets to pick their song. At the end of this round, three artists will remain on each group with twelve artists overall advancing to the next round.

Lea Salonga was absent during the taping of her team's Knockout performances due to her tonsillitis. Salonga watched the recorded performances of her team on a later date to pick the winner for each Knockout grouping.

Tyson Venegas of Team Apl left the competition prior to the Knockouts due to undisclosed reasons. As a result, there were only two Knockout groups on Team Apl with one group composing of five artists with two artists being selected to advance to the next round.

With the advancement of Kate Campo, she became the first stolen artist to advance to the Finals in the entire Philippine franchise of The Voice. Furthermore, the advancement of Heart Salvador, Kate Campo and Rock Opong made Kamp Kawayan the first team to have 3 comeback artists to advance to the Finals in the entire Philippine franchise of The Voice.

Finale
The live shows were originally slated to start in May 2020. However, due to the COVID-19 pandemic causing a three-month long lockdown across Luzon and the non-renewal of the ABS-CBN franchise, the shows were postponed for a few months, eventually being abolished due to the circumstances. As a result, all of the remaining contestants advanced to the prerecorded finale.

Finale (August 15 & 16) 
Due to the travel restrictions, the artists and the coaches had to record their performances at their homes, following the instructions of the technical staff. The finale was taped on the first week of August 2020.

The winners of each team were determined by the four coaches themselves since the finale was prerecorded, featuring no interactive viewer voting component, and therefore, no results shows.

Each team performed as a group with their coach. Afterwards, each coach was given 100 points to divide among the three artists. Half of the artist's score is composed of the score given by their coach while the other half is composed of the scores given by the other coaches. The artists with the highest score in their respective teams will be named as winners.

Color key:

Notable artists 
Reiven Umali auditioned in the blind auditions, failing to turn any chairs. As a result of limited airtime, his audition was not aired. He later participated in the fifth season of Tawag ng Tanghalan where he was crowned the winner.
Rock Opong participated in the second season of The Voice Kids as part of Team Sarah where he was eliminated in the Battles. He has also appeared in the Philippine version of Little Big Shots and was also a semifinalist in the third season of Asia's Got Talent. He also appeared on Tawag ng Tanghalan Kids as an Ultimate Resbaker.
Tyson Venegas appeared in the U.S. version of Little Big Shots. He later appeared on the twenty-first season of American Idol. He received a platinum ticket and is currently competing.
Kate Campo participated in the second season of The Voice Kids as part of Team Bamboo where she was eliminated in the Battles to Elha Nympha, who ended up as the winner of the season. She also appeared on Tawag ng Tanghalan Kids as an Ultimate Resbaker. She also appeared on Lola's Playlist on Eat Bulaga!.
Jessie Gonzales is the sister of The Voice Teens Season 1 teen artist Gia Gonzales and the cousin of Zephanie Dimaranan, a semifinalist of Team Sarah in the second season of The Voice Kids and winner of the inaugural season of Idol Philippines.
Kendra Aguirre and Airene Bautista participated in the World Championship of Performing Arts, where they won multiple medals ultimately placing in the semi-finals. Airene later appeared and won as daily winner on the sixth season of Tawag ng Tanghalan.
Hakki Patricio and Aaron Regala participated in the World Championship of Performing Arts.
Larah Ella Sabroso appeared in ABS-CBN's 2013 television series, May Isang Pangarap.
Jelo Acosta had minor roles on Kadenang Ginto and Since I Found You.
Lukas Magallano is the winner of the second season of I-Shine Talent Camp. He is also one of the former hosts of the children's television show Team Yey!.
Heart Salvador participated in the third season of The Voice Kids as part of Team Bamboo where she was eliminated in the semifinals. She also appeared on Tawag ng Tanghalan Kids.
Matt Reyes later appeared on the second season of Idol Philippines under the screen name Thias and was eliminated in the Do or Die Round.
Drei Sugay later appeared on the second season of Idol Philippines and finished in eleventh place.
Joshua Nubla later appeared on Dream Maker but he was eliminated in the third round and finished in Rank 20 of the overall individual ranking. 
Josh Labing-isa later appeared on the fifth season of Tawag ng Tanghalan and was eliminated in the Quarterfinals to Reiven Umali, who ended up as the winner of the season. He also appeared on Dream Maker but he was eliminated in the final episode and finished in Rank 16 of the overall individual ranking.
Russell Solis, Andre Parker and Yang-Yang Aloya later appeared on the fifth season of Tawag ng Tanghalan. Andre won as daily winner and Yang-Yang became a defending champion. Andre also appeared on Tawag ng Tanghalan Kids as an Ultimate Resbaker.
Jhon Van Lapu later appeared on Tawag ng Tanghalan. He won as daily winner in second season and became a 3-time defending champion in sixth season.
Andrei Lunar, Andre Eusebio, Aly Fabellar, Claire Siggaoat, Max Abliter, Vincent Gregorio, Hana Adriano, Pia Banga and Calvin Candelaria later appeared on the sixth season of Tawag ng Tanghalan. Max, Vincent, Hana and Calvin won as daily winners and Pia became a 2-time defending champion. Max also appeared and became one of the grand finalists in Showtime Sexy Babe, a former segment of It's Showtime.
AJ Yape later became a member of the P-pop group G22, as the group's leader and main rapper.

Television ratings
Television ratings for the second season of The Voice Teens on ABS-CBN were gathered from Kantar Media, where its survey ratings are gathered from urban and rural households all over the Philippines.

References

The Voice of the Philippines
The Voice Teens (Philippine TV series)
2020 Philippine television seasons
Television productions suspended due to the COVID-19 pandemic